Siah Khulak (also Romanized as Sīāh Khūlak; also known as Sīāh Khalak) is a village in Somam Rural District, Rankuh District, Amlash County, Gilan Province, Iran. At the 2006 census, its population was 149, in 44 families.

References 

Populated places in Amlash County